Sony Vaio FE series started in 2006 with the FE11 and ends in 2007 with the FE41.

The FE series was designed as an entertainment notebook that is suitably portable. The FE series includes FE11, FE21, FE28, FE31, FE41 and FE48 models. They possess various types of a 15.4" 1280x800 X-Black screen either with one or two backlight lamps. It is not widely known that the type and quality of the LCD matrix has also widely varied. The FE11 (and supposedly FE21) series has a rare type of a 72% TrueColor screen whose colour reproduction quality makes it suitable for graphics applications. FE31 series possesses a low quality screen whose colour reproduction is of the market average level at best. Some improvements have been made to the FE41 series screens, which have become better but do not reach the FE11 screen quality.

It was superseded by the Sony VAIO FZ series in July 2007.

Nearly all the FE series machines contain a VGA (640x480) webcam, wireless A/B/G, memory stick reader and later models have Bluetooth. The VGN-FE28B does not contain a webcam.

References 

Fe